Michael Kliën (born 1973) is a choreographer and artist. His work is concerned with the theoretical and practical reworking of choreography and dance and its contribution to society. Kliën is acknowledged for his interdisciplinary thinking, critical writing, curatorial projects and choreographic works equally at home in the Performing as well as the Fine Arts.

The most notable works include 'Einem' Ballett Frankfurt, 'Sediments of an Ordinary Mind' and 'Standing in Ink' for Daghdha Dance Company, 'Choreography for Blackboards' for Hayward Gallery, 'Slattery's Lamp' for IMMA's (Irish Museum of Modern Art) permanent collection, a solo-exhibition at IMMA and the publication of 'Books of Recommendations' – Choreography as an Aesthetics of Change'.

Biography
Kliën was born in Hollbrunn, Austria and grew up in Vienna. He is the brother of composer and media artist Volkmar Klien and comedian Peter Klien.  After early training in classical and modern dance in Vienna and New York he studied contemporary dance at the Laban Centre for Movement and Dance, London. Kliën co-founded Barriedale Operahouse a London-based performance collective (1994 until 2000) and the commercial live-events consultancy BOHI Ltd (1996–1999). In 2003 he was appointed Artistic Director/CEO of Daghdha Dance Company (until 2011), Ireland. As the choreographer, curator and producer of numerous touring productions, installations, festivals and events and his work has been situated across the world. Co-founder of website Choreograph.net (2001) and a founding member of The Institute of Social Choreography (with Kliën's longterm collaborator Steve Valk) (2012). During his two years as a guest-choreographer at Ballett Frankfurt he also acted as artistic advisor to William Forsythe. He was awarded a PhD from Edinburgh College of Art in 2009 and regularly lecturers at various international institutions. He lives with his wife and daughter alternately in Greece and Ireland.

Approaches to choreography
Kliën understands choreography as an autonomous artistic discipline concerned with the workings and governance of patterns, dynamics and ecologies. The aim of this conception is to engage choreography's social potential to pursue sustainable orders of human relations (Social Choreography). According to Kliën 'choreography as an aesthetics of change' assumes the creative practice of setting relations, or setting the conditions for new relations to emerge. His 2002 definition "choreography as setting the conditions for things to happen" is frequently used amongst practitioners. A more elaborate definition, that he co-authored with writer Jeffrey Gormly in 2005, is cited increasingly in academia

Work
Kliën's choreographies are predominantly dance-based works of art, situated in galleries, museums or on stages. Visual art works often form part of his choreographic output and other works act directly upon the social sphere (Social Choreography). Initially his work was concerned with modelling and exploring structures of living-systems. After 2004 it shifted towards possible contributions choreography can make in the forming of society and the disclosure of reality through dance. His choreographies for dance are marked by a distinctive improvisation methodology and the subsequent movement aesthetic.

Choreographic work listing
 68% Choreography (1994) – choreography for violin and machine
 Blue-2 (1995) – dance performance
 Finnegan's Organge Kinesphere in My Breakfast (1996) with Nicholas Mortimore– dance installation
 Orange and in between (1996) – dance performance
 TWEEK (1997) – multimedia dance performance
 Solo One (1998) –non-linear choreography presentation
 Choreography in C (1998) –installation for kitchen processors
 PDE (Peripheral Dinner Entertainment) (1999) – interactive choreographic installation
 CAY – multimedia live event (1999), ICA
 Prosxima's Drift (2000) with Nicholas Mortimore – non-linear choreography
 Nodding Dog (2001) with N. Mortimore and D. Terlingo – large scale non-linear ballet
 Duplex (2001) – Pas De Deux
 Einem (2002) – complex choreographic structure for solo dance performance
 Im Fett (2003) – choreographic score incorporating learning dynamics
 Slattery's Lamp (2004) – choreographic object
 Once Beneath the Skin (2004) – dance performance
 Sediments of an Ordinary Mind (2004) – dance performance
 Iris (2005) with D.Terlingo – large-scale social choreography
 Limerick Trilogy (2005) – dance performance
 Choreography for Blackboards (2006) with Steve Valk – choreography for citizens
 Field Studies (2007) – choreographic process
 Sense and Meaning (2008) with Elena Giannotti – dance performance
 Standing in Ink (2008) – dance performance
 To Build A Hall (2009) – dance performance
 The Ponderous (2011) – choreographic installation / drawing
 Silent Witness (2011) – objectless choreography
 A Dancing Man (2011) – installation
 Excavation Site (2013) – alternative format for dancing
 Sepolia (2013) with Kaspar Aus – objectless choreography
 Parliament (2014) – exhibition – choreographic site
 Jerusalem (2014) – performance

Notable other work
 Shift 99 / Shift 00 (1999/2000) – Conferences on Contemporary Choreography, New Media and Culture, London
 Choreograph.net (2000) – co-founder of website
 Open TAT (2001) with Steve Valk and William Forsythe– conceptual planning of large-scale social choreography
 Gravity & Grace (2003–10) – annual alternative dance festival, Limerick, Ireland.
 Framemakers (2005- ) international public thinktank and lecture series
 Daghdha Space (2005–2011) conception, refurbishment, and curation of St. John's Church / Daghdha Space

Choreographic methodology
Kliën developed a series of new choreographic methods including non-linear, distributed and dialogical procedures as well as improvisation methodologies for dance. Underlying these is a mapping procedure that allows dancers to embody their streams of consciousness in real time as well as Kliën's notion of 'Sedimenting', meaning the accumulation of selected movement material through learning in real-time as integral part of the choreography.

Publications
 'ChoreoGraph –Non-Linear Choreography & Fluid Environments', M.Klien & N. Mortimore, Performance Research Journal, Vol. 4, No.2, 1999, Routledge, UK
 'Choreography – A Pattern Language', M. Klien, Kybernetics Journal Vol. 36 No. 7/8, 2007, Emerald Publishers, UK
 'What Do You Choreograph at the End of the World?', M.Klien & S.Valk, Zodiak: Unden Taussin Taehen, 2007, Like, Finland
 'Book of Recommendations –Choreography As An Aesthetics of Change', M.Klien & S.Valk & J.Gormly, 2008, Daghdha, Ireland
'Framemakers: Choreography as an Aesthetics of Change', Gormly, J., (ed.), 2008, Daghdha, Ireland
 'Choreographic Drawings', M. Kliën, Boulevard Magenta, Journal 6, 2009, IMMA, Ireland
 'Propositions: To Dance Differently, M. Kliën

References

External links
 Personal Homepage
 Facebook Page
 Video Documentation of Work
  Daghdha Archive
  Institute of Social Choreography
  Choreograph.net

1973 births
Austrian choreographers
Dancers from Vienna
Irish artists
Living people
Contemporary dance choreographers
Alumni of the Edinburgh College of Art